Miguel Antônio Bianconi Kohl (born 14 May 1992), or simply Miguel Bianconi, is a Brazilian professional footballer who plays as a striker for Bolivian Primera División club Wilstermann.

Career

Platanias
On 22 August 2018, Bianconi joined Football League club Platanias, signing a three-year contract on a free transfer.

He finished his debut season with 16 goals in 29 assists, but his team missed out promotion against OFI.

Lamia
On 10 January 2020, following his release from Platanias, Superleague club Lamia officially announced the acquisition of the Brazilian striker on a free transfer. Five days later, he scored his first goal for the club in a 1–1 home draw against Trikala, as his team qualified for the quarter finals of the Greek Cup.

On 27 January 2020, he scored his first league goal in a 1–1 home draw against Asteras Tripolis.

On 8 June 2020, he scored in a 2–0 home win against Panetolikos for the 2019–20 Superleague playoffs after an 80-day enforced COVID-19 break.

His first goal for the 2020–21 season came in a 2–1 home defeat against Volos.

Levadiakos
On 2 February 2021, he signed a contract with Levadiakos, on a free transfer.

Career statistics

Club

Honours

Individual
2018–19  Football League Greece top scorer

References

External links
 
 

 
 

1992 births
Living people
Brazilian footballers
Association football forwards
Campeonato Brasileiro Série A players
Campeonato Brasileiro Série B players
K League 2 players
J2 League players
Liga I players
Sociedade Esportiva Palmeiras players
Comercial Futebol Clube (Ribeirão Preto) players
Chungju Hummel FC players
Associação Atlética Ponte Preta players
Bonsucesso Futebol Clube players
Kamatamare Sanuki players
Mogi Mirim Esporte Clube players
ACS Poli Timișoara
Clube Atlético Bragantino players
Brazilian expatriate footballers
Expatriate footballers in South Korea
Brazilian expatriate sportspeople in South Korea
Brazilian expatriate sportspeople in Japan
Expatriate footballers in Japan
Brazilian expatriate sportspeople in Romania
Expatriate footballers in Romania
PAS Lamia 1964 players
People from Mococa